Bastien Vivès (born 11 February 1984) is a French comic book artist.

Life and career
Born in Paris, Vivès spent his childhood drawing with his younger brother. He took live model classes from the age of 10 years. Vivès studied Applied arts at the Institut Sainte Geneviève Paris (6th) and three years at the Penninghen School of Graphic Arts in Paris and eventually Gobelins School, still in Paris, where he studied animation.

He achieved success first on the internet in 2002 on his BK Crew website under the pseudonym "Chanmax" with the character and comic strips of "Poungi la Racaille", which became viral, and was published in libraries in 2006 by Danger Public.

His first album, Elle(s), published in 2007 by Casterman under the KSTR label and when he was 25 years old, in January 2009, Vivès received the Angoulême Festival Revelation Award for his album A Taste of Chlorine (Le goût du chlore). In France, he became considered as one of the most promising and successful comic artist of his generation.

In 2010 and 2011, he participated of the online drama Les Autres Gens, written by Thomas Cadène, drawing seven episodes.

In 2013, he published the "French manga" series Lastman, together with Michaël Sanlaville and Balak.

In 2021, his graphic novel Une sœur was adapted by Charlotte Le Bon into the theatrical feature film Falcon Lake, which is slated to premiere at the 2022 Cannes Film Festival.

In 2022, in the wake of the 50th anniversary of the International Festival of Angouleme, an exhibition featuring exclusive new illustrations by the artist (and no old ones) was programmed. Several petitions were launched to oppose this decision, claiming the Festival was putting in the spotlight an artist whose work was, if not encouraging, displaying incestuous and pedophile images and scenes. Criticisms had already been made in 2011, and again in 2018, particularly following the publication of his album Petit Paul. Old interviews and social media posts resurfaced, and Vivès was accused of promoting rape culture.  The festival mentioned threats and intimidation as the reason for cancelling the exhibit.

Works

References

External links 
 Author's blog (in French)

Living people
1984 births
French comics artists
Artists from Paris
French graphic novelists
Obscenity controversies in comics